Thomas Henry Walduck (4 September 1844 – 24 January 1913) was an Australian politician.

Walduck was born in Glenorchy in Tasmania in 1844. In 1900 he was elected to the Tasmanian House of Assembly, representing the seat of George Town. He served until his defeat in 1903. He died in 1913 in Beaconsfield.

References

1844 births
1913 deaths
Members of the Tasmanian House of Assembly